The Congressional Cannabis Caucus is a registered caucus in the United States Congress, formed in 2017 during the 115th session. The bipartisan caucus was founded by Republicans Dana Rohrabacher and Don Young and Democrats Earl Blumenauer and Jared Polis. The Congressional Cannabis Caucus seeks to harmonize federal laws that conflict with various state laws that permit medical and recreational cannabis.

Background
Dana Rohrabacher, a Republican member of the United States House of Representatives from California, coauthored the Rohrabacher–Farr amendment, which was passed by the 113th United States Congress in 2014. The amendment prevented the United States Department of Justice from using its funding to challenge states that have approved medical cannabis laws. Meanwhile, Earl Blumenauer, a member of House of Representatives from Oregon in the Democratic Party, supported Oregon Ballot Measure 91 in 2014, legalizing recreational cannabis in Oregon. Rohrabacher endorsed the Adult Use of Marijuana Act, which legalized recreational cannabis in California in 2016, and acknowledged using medical cannabis to treat his arthritis.

In 2016, Blumenauer and Rohrabacher agreed to form a congressional caucus to streamline cannabis reform legislation at the federal level, considering it a states' rights issue. In February 2017, Rohrabacher and Blumenauer launched the caucus with Jared Polis, a Democrat from Colorado, and Don Young a Republican from Alaska. The caucus intends to increase medical research into cannabis and change regulations on banking and taxation for cannabis businesses.

In the 116th Congress, Rohrbacher and Polis left Congress and were replaced by Barbara Lee, a Democrat from California, and David Joyce, a Republican from Ohio, as co-chairs. After Don Young died in office in 2022, he was replaced by Brian Mast of Florida.

Members 

Current members:
 Earl Blumenauer
 Barbara Lee
 David Joyce
 Brian Mast
Former members:
 Jared Polis – Successfully ran for Colorado governor in 2018.
 Dana Rohrabacher – Defeated during his 2018 re-election campaign.
 Don Young – Died in office in March 2022.

References

Further reading

2017 establishments in Washington, D.C.
2017 in cannabis
Cannabis in the United States
Ideological caucuses of the United States Congress
Political advocacy groups in the United States